| tries = {{#expr: 
 +  5 +  7 +  4 +  7 + 13 +  8 +  3 +  9
 +  5 +  7 + 12 +  5 +  7 +  3 +  8 +  3 
 +  4 +  8 +  4 +  5 +  2 +  3 +  5 +  6
 +  9 +  9 +  5 +  6
 +  4
}}
| top point scorer = 
| top try scorer = 
| venue = Stadio Luigi Zaffanella, Viadana
| attendance2 = 2,553
| champions =  Montpellier
| count = 1
| runner-up =   Viadana
| website = https://web.archive.org/web/20080506141030/http://www.ercrugby.com/eng/
| previous year = 2002–03
| previous tournament = 2002–03 European Shield
| next year = 2004–05
| next tournament = 2004–05 European Shield
}}
The 2003–04 European Shield (known as the Parker Pen Shield for sponsorship reasons) was the 2nd season of the European Shield, Europe's third-tier club rugby union competition below the Heineken Cup and European Challenge Cup. A total of 16 teams participated, representing five different countries.

This competition was contested between 12 first round losers from the 2003–04 European Challenge Cup plus 4 other Clubs entering directly into the 1st Round.  The structure of the competition was a purely knockout format; teams played each other on a home and away basis, with the aggregate points winner proceeding to the next round. The final was a single leg.

The competition began on 10 January 2004 and culminated in the final at the Stadio Luigi Zaffanella in Viadana on 21 May 2004.  Montpellier secured a victory over Viadana in the final and picked up their first piece of European Club silverware.

Teams
This competition was contested between 12 first round losers from the 2003–04 European Challenge Cup, plus 4 other Clubs that joined directly at the 1st Round of the Shield.

Matches

Round 1
All kickoff times are local to the match location.

1st Leg

2nd Leg

Aggregate Results

Quarter-finals

1st Leg
All kickoff times are local to the match location.

2nd Leg
All kickoff times are local to the match location.

Aggregate Results

Semifinals
All kickoff times are local to the match location.

1st Leg

2nd Leg

Aggregate Results

Final

See also
2003-04 Heineken Cup
2003-04 European Challenge Cup
European Shield

External links
 BBC Parker Pen Cup & Shield 2003/4 results summary

References

European
2003–04
2003–04 European Challenge Cup
2003–04 in European rugby union
2003–04 in English rugby union
2003–04 in French rugby union
2003–04 in Italian rugby union
2003–04 in Spanish rugby union
rugby union
rugby union